Ole Robert Sunde (born 11 November 1952 in Kristiansand) is a Norwegian poet, novelist and essayist. He made his literary debut in 1982 with the poetry collection Hakk i hæl. He was awarded the Aschehoug Prize in 2001, and the Gyldendal Prize in 2007.

Bibliography 
 Hakk i hæl – poem (1982)
 Fra dette punktet trekker jeg en omkrets – poem (1983)
 Den lange teksten historie – novel (1984)
 Kontrapunktisk – novel (1987)
 4. person entall – essays (1990)
 Naturligvis måtte hun ringe – novel (1992)
 En ordinær høyde – novel (1994)
 Støvets applaus – essays (1995)
 All verdens småting – texts (1996)
 Den sovende stemmen – novel (1999)
 Der hvor vi er lykkelige – Essays (2000)
 Løsøre – texts (2003)
 Jeg er som en åpen bok – novel (2005)
 Kalypso (2006)
 Jeg er et vilt begrep (2007)
 Selvomsorg (2010)
 Krigen var min families historie (2012) - nominert til Nordisk råds litteraturpris
 Hvorfor er vannet vått, children's book, Gyldendal (2013)
 Verden uten ende, essays (2014)
 Tenk fort, novel, Gyldendal (2016)
 Penelope er syk, novel, Gyldendal (2017)
Jeg føler meg uvel, novel, Gyldendal (2019)

References

Further reading 

1952 births
Living people
20th-century Norwegian poets
Norwegian male poets
20th-century Norwegian novelists
21st-century Norwegian novelists
Norwegian essayists
Norwegian male novelists
Male essayists
20th-century essayists
21st-century essayists
20th-century Norwegian male writers
21st-century Norwegian male writers